They Made Me a Killer is a 1946 American film noir crime film directed by William C. Thomas, and written by Daniel Mainwaring, Winston Miller and Kae Salkow, based on story by Owen Franes.  It stars Barbara Britton and Robert Lowery, and marks the final screen appearance of Lola Lane. It was made by Pine-Thomas, the B-movie unit of Paramount Pictures.

Plot  

After his brother is killed in an accident, Tom Durling quits his job and drives across country. He gives an attractive girl a ride and is subsequently forced at gun point to be the driver in a bank robbery. During the crime another innocent man, Steve Reynolds, is involved and killed in the escape. After a high-speed chase, the car crashes and Durling is knocked unconscious. The bandits get away, the police arrest Durling and refuse to believe that he isn't one of the robbers.

Durling escapes the police then later teams with Reynolds' sister in an attempt to prove his innocence.  The trail leads to a small roadside diner where the two end up finding the gang hiding out in the building's basement.  They go undercover, she as a waitress and Durling joining the gang.  In the end, they trick the criminals into confessing their crimes. Durling's reputation is saved, and the criminals, led by a Ma Barker-type mom, get shot up.

Cast
 Robert Lowery as Tom Durling
 Barbara Britton as June Reynolds
 Lola Lane as Betty Ford
 Frank Albertson as Al Wilson, Glen Grove patrolman
 Elisabeth Risdon as 'Ma' Conley (as Elizabeth Risdon)
 Byron Barr as Steve Reynolds
 Edmund MacDonald as Jack Conley aka Chance
 Ralph Sanford as Patrolman Roach
 James Bush as Frank Conley
 Paul Harvey as District Attorney Booth
 John Harmon as Joe Lafferty

External links 
 
 

1946 films
1946 crime drama films
American black-and-white films
American crime drama films
Film noir
Films directed by William C. Thomas
Paramount Pictures films
1940s English-language films
1940s American films